Younger Generation may refer to:

Younger Generation, List of Shaw Brothers films List of Hong Kong films of 1971
The Younger Generation 1929 American film
"Younger Generation", song on the Lovin' Spoonful's album Everything Playing (1967), covered by the Critters